The Imo State College of Education is a state government higher education institution located in Ihitte/Uboma, Imo State, Nigeria. The current acting Provost is Bonn Asiegbu.

History 
The Imo State College of Education was established in 2010.

Courses 
The institution offers the following courses;

 Economics
 Igbo
 French
 English Education
 Christian Religious Studies
 Computer Science Education
 Environmental Health Technology
 Social Studies
 History
 Special Education
 Political Science Education

References 

Universities and colleges in Nigeria
2010 establishments in Nigeria